Saint-Andéol (Vivaro-Alpine: Sant Andiòu) is a commune in the Drôme department in southeastern France.

Population

See also
Communes of the Drôme department
Parc naturel régional du Vercors

References

Communes of Drôme
Drôme communes articles needing translation from French Wikipedia